Quentin Walcker (born 21 February 1996 in France) is a French rugby union player who plays for  in the Top 14. His playing position is prop. He made his debut for France in the 2021 July rugby union tests against Australia.

Reference list

External links
itsrugby.co.uk profile

1996 births
French rugby union players
France international rugby union players
Living people
Rugby union props
USA Perpignan players
Castres Olympique players